Sophie of Solms-Laubach (15 May 1594 – 16 May 1651), was a German regent, Margravine of Brandenburg-Ansbach by marriage to Joachim Ernst, and regent during the minority of her son from 1625 until 1639.

Early life
Sophie's parents were Count Johann Georg I of Solms-Laubach (1547–1600) and his wife, Margarethe of Schönburg-Glauchau (1554–1606).

Biography 
She married Margrave Joachim Ernst of Brandenburg-Ansbach in 1612. After her husband's death in 1625, she took over the reign of the Margraviate of Brandenburg-Ansbach, as guardian and regent for her minor son Frederick.  Frederick died in 1634 in the Battle of Nördlingen, shortly after he came of age.  Sophie then continued reigning as regent for her son Albert, until he came of age in 1639.  She was supported during her reign by her brother Count Frederick of Solms-Rödelheim, who served as an Imperial chamberlain.

Offspring 
Sophie of Solms-Laubach had a daughter and four sons:
 Sophie (1614–1646), married to Erdmann August of Brandenburg-Bayreuth
 Frederick (1616–1634), Margrave of Brandenburg-Ansbach
 Albert (1617-1617)
 Albert (1620–1667), Margrave of Brandenburg-Ansbach
 Christian (1623–1633)

|-

References 
 M. Spindler, A. Kraus: History of Franconia until the end of the 18th Century, Munich, 1997, 

1594 births
1651 deaths
People from Laubach
Sophie
Margravines of Brandenburg-Ansbach
Regents of Germany
17th-century women rulers